Russian Disco is a 2012 German comedy film based on the eponymous novel by Wladimir Kaminer.

Cast 
 Matthias Schweighöfer - Wladimir Kaminer
 Friedrich Mücke - Mischa
 Christian Friedel - Andrej
 Peri Baumeister - Olga
  - Hanna
 Imogen Kogge - Frau Kaminer
 Rainer Bock - Herr Kaminer
  - Helena
 Jule Böwe - Jule
 Waldemar Kobus - Rabbi
  - Wladimir als Teenager

References

External links 

2012 comedy films
2012 films
German comedy films
Films about immigration
Films set in Berlin
Films set in the 1990s
Films about Jews and Judaism
2010s German-language films
2010s German films